The 2001 Cincinnati Masters was a tennis tournament played on outdoor hard courts. It was the 100th edition of the Cincinnati Masters and was part of the Tennis Masters Series of the 2001 ATP Tour. It took place at the Lindner Family Tennis Center in Mason, Ohio in the United States from August 6 through August 12, 2001.

The tournament had previously appeared as part of Tier III of the WTA Tour but no event was held from 1989 to 2003.

Finals

Singles

 Gustavo Kuerten defeated  Patrick Rafter 6–1, 6–3
 It was Kuerten's 7th title of the year and the 24th of his career. It was his 2nd Masters title of the year and his 5th overall.

Doubles

 Mahesh Bhupathi /  Leander Paes defeated  Martin Damm /  David Prinosil 7–6(7–3), 6–3
 It was Bhupathi's 4th title of the year and the 21st of his career. It was Paes' 4th title of the year and the 24th of his career.

References

External links
 
 Association of Tennis Professionals (ATP) tournament profile

 
Cincinnati Masters
2001
Cincinnati Masters